Vaitahu is the name of a bay and valley in western Tahuata.  It is the site of most important village on that island.

Spanish explorer Álvaro de Mendaña landed here on 21 July 1595 and named the town Madre de Dios (God's Mother in Spanish).  In 1774, Captain James Cook landed here (and named it Resolution Bay), and it was here that Admiral Abel Aubert du Petit-Thouars signed the treaty of annexation of the Marquesas to France, in 1842.

The first Christian missionaries in the Marquesas Islands settled there in 1797, first Protestants who arrived on the ship Duff, and later, Roman Catholics.  The Catholic church, decorated with magnificent stained glass windows, is the most imposing structure in the small village.

See also
French Polynesia
Marquesas Islands

Bodies of water of the Marquesas Islands
Bays of the Pacific Ocean
Landforms of the Marquesas Islands
Valleys of Oceania